The K.R.T. Arts, B.H. Commerce & A.M. Science College, Nashik, popularly known as KTHM College, Nashik was established in 1969 and is affiliated to University of Pune. The college is situated on a campus on the bank of river Godavari. Maratha Vidya Prasaraka Samaj, Nashik the parent organization of KTHM is the second largest educational institute in Maharashtra.

Academics 
The college offers  degree in Arts, Humanities, Politics, Commerce, Science and Computer Science. The college offers undergraduate and postgraduate courses in arts, science and commerce including professional courses in computer science, animation and journalism. Short term courses like Video Production, Foreign Languages are also offered. College also offers the junior college courses in arts, commerce, science and in various vocational streams.

The college also provides facility for distance education and has established study centres of Indira Gandhi National Open University (IGNOU) and Yashwantrao Chavan Maharashtra Open University(YCMOU), Nashik.

References

External links
Official Website

Universities and colleges in Maharashtra
Colleges affiliated to Savitribai Phule Pune University
Education in Nashik
Educational institutions established in 1969
1969 establishments in Maharashtra